The Dederang Mount Beauty Football Netball Club, nicknamed the Bombers, is an Australian rules football and netball club based in Dederang, Victoria. Dederang teams currently play in the Tallangatta & District Football League.

History

Origins

Dederang Football Club (1906-1975)
 1906-1922: No league.
1923–1924: Allans Flat District Football League
1925–1926: Kiewa & District Football League
1927–1937: Dederang & District Football League
1938–1954: Yackandandah Football League
1955–1975: Tallangatta & District Football League

Tawonga F.C.
1927–1931: Bright District Football League
1932–1939: Myrtleford-Bright Football League
1940–1953: Yackandandah Football League
1954–1963: Tallangatta & District Football League

Bogong F.C.
1947–1953: Yackandandah Football League
1954–1959: Ovens & King Football League
1960–1963: Tallangatta & District Football League

Mt. Beauty-Tawong F.C. – (Tawonga F.C. & Bogong F.C. Merged)
1964–1975: Tallangatta & District Football League

Dederang-Mt. Beauty F.C. – (Mt. Beauty-Tawong F.C. & Dederang F.C. Merged)
1976– NOW: Tallangatta & District Football League

Premierships
Yackandandah Football League
6:
Ovens & King Football League
1:
Tallangatta & District Football League
5: 1958; 1962; 1999; 2001; 2003.

References

External links
 

Australian rules football clubs in Victoria (Australia)
Sports clubs established in 1976
1976 establishments in Australia
Netball teams in Victoria (Australia)
Australian rules football clubs established in 1976